Fudbalski klub Novi Pazar is a professional football club from Novi Pazar, Serbia . The club was formed in 1928 as FK Deževa. FK Novi Pazar compete in the Serbian SuperLiga and play their home games at the 12,000 capacity Novi Pazar City Stadium. The club has got a B team FK Novi Pazar 1928 who plays in the Serbian Zone League.

The club draws the majority of its support from the Bosniak population, as Novi Pazar is the cultural centre of the Bosniak Muslims in Serbia.

The club has achieved its greatest successes since Serbia has become an independent country, reaching the top tier of national competition for the first time ever in the 2011–12 Serbian SuperLiga. Novi Pazar was granted promotion after 2010–11 Serbian First League champions BASK withdrew from the SuperLiga due to limited funds and not meeting the required stadium criteria set out by the Football Association of Serbia.

In 2019–20 they finished mid-table in the Serbian First League (second tier) but due to the FSS (Football Association of Serbia) re-structuring the Serbian SuperLiga and due to FK Novi Pazar having a modern UEFA standard stadium when most clubs in Serbia don't, they were awarded a place/took the place of FK Grafičar Beograd, a Belgrade club who basically had a pitch/field and no stadium to speak of and hence had to withdraw from the Serbian SuperLiga due to limited funds and not meeting the required stadium criteria set out by the Football Association of Serbia.

Yugoslav period
The club was founded in 1928, under the name FK Sandžak, which later changed to FK Deževa. The club has played under its current name since 1962, when FK Deževa and another local football club, the FK Ras, merged under the name FK Novi Pazar. The club was a Yugoslav amateur-leagues champion, and was later a member of the Yugoslav Second League.

Its first notable achievement happened in 1984 when the club won the Serbian Republic League, at time one of Yugoslav third tiers, and were promoted to the Yugoslav Second League for the first time in 56 years of existence till then. They finished the season with 43 points (at time it was two points per victory) with 17 wins, 9 draws and 4 losses, and a score balance of 42–14.  The Serbian Republic League at time was very competitive and Novi Pazar that season finished top of teams such as Radnički Kragujevac, Čukarički, Obilić, Sinđelić, Jagodina, Sloga Kraljevo, Loznica, Dubočica, Radnički Obrenovac, Budućnost Valjevo, Rudar Kostolac, Kristal Zaječar, Majdanpek, Đerdap Kladovo and 7. Juli Vrčin.  The celebration of the promotion to the Second League happened in the last round in the 2–1 home victory over 7. Juli, but the major celebration happened two rounds earlier when Novi Pazar secured the league title at the 1–1 draw away in Belgrade against Sinđelić.  The game was attended by 3.000 spectators of which 2.500 were Novi Pazar fans that had travelled to Belgrade.  The goal for Novi Pazar was scored by Milan Glavčić who scored 23 goals overall that season and was the club's top scorer.  The players that formed that notorious generation of Novi Pazar that season were goalkeepers Novica Jovanović, Dragan Goševac, Naser Halitović, defenders Dragan Kostić, Bajro Župić, Darko Vujović, Esad Karišik, Nazim Izberović, Ratko Šarac, Radojica Milojević, Salih Detanac, Izet Ljajić, Ljutvo Bogućanin, midfielders Ferid Ganić, Rizo Tutić, Mirsad Karišik, Adnan Numanović, Ismail Bihorac, Nermin Ukić, and forwards Ismet Ugljanin, Milan Glavčić, Gmitar Vukadinović, Šerif Izberović and Naser Salihu. The club president was Amir Beširović while the coach was Dušan Radonjić and his assistant was Aćif Klimenta.

Besides this major achievement, the generation of 1984 will also manage to win the, back then respectable, Yugoslav amateur-league leagues champion, which was played between the winners of the all eight leagues forming the Yugoslav third tier, the six republic leagues (Bosnia and Herzegovina, Croatia, Macedonia, Montenegro, Serbia and Slovenia) and the two autonomous provinces ones (Kosovo and Vojvodina).  As winner of the 1983–84 Serbian Republic League, FK Novi Pazar represented Serbia that year and won the tournament.  After beating Liria away in Prizren by 3–0, Novi Pazar played the final home in the City Stadium where it won Crvenka by 2–0 with goals of Esad Karišik and Ismet Ugljanin.  A member of that generation, Enver Gusinac, who became club captain in the seasons that followed, missed the season because of the Yugoslav People's Army conscription, made his return at that final game.

Serbia/Montenegro Period
The club qualified for a promotion play-off spot for the First League of FR Yugoslavia twice, but lost on both occasions. They lost to Sutjeska Nikšić in 1994, and to Sloboda Užice in 1995.  In 2002, the club was relegated to the Serbian League, third division in Serbia. After one season in the Serbian League they were promoted back to the Serbian First League. During the 1980s and 1990s the club was magnet to many of the talented Kosovo Albanian players such as Nazmi Rama, Naser Salihu, Mentor Miftari, Sadik Rrahmani, Gëzim Hasi, Besnik Kollari, Shefqer Kurti, or manager Hysni Maxhuni.

First time in SuperLiga

The club played in the second tier until 2011, when they came in third. At the end of the 2010–11 Serbian First League season, first-placed second-tier team FK BASK was not financially prepared for the Serbian SuperLiga, which caused a huge controversy and debate in Serbian football circles regarding who in BASK's place should take the birth in the top-tier Serbian SuperLiga in the following season. Two candidates emerged: FK Inđija, which had occupied a relegation place in the previous SuperLiga season, and FK Novi Pazar, which finished in non-promoting third place in the second-tier championship. Both clubs were backed by political proxies in their campaigns to take BASKS's place in the SuperLiga. Goran Ješić, who was the president of the municipality of Inđija as well as an official of the Democratic Party, represented the lobby for FK Inđija to keep its place in the top flight. FK Novi Pazar, meanwhile, was backed by the powerful lobby of Rasim Ljajić. In the end, FK Novi Pazar was promoted along with second-place Radnički Kragujevac. The 2011–12 Serbian SuperLiga was the first ever season in which FK Novi Pazar played in the top flight. Ivan Babić participated in a historic moment for FK Novi Pazar after scoring the first goal in the top division for the club.

Recent History
The season of 2012–2013 was a difficult one for the club. After the first half of the season FK Novi Pazar ranked 10th place in the Serbian Superliga.
In December 2012, an accumulated financial crisis in the club resulted in several players and directors leaving the club. Irfan Vušljanin, regarded by many as one of the club's best players in recent years, was quoted saying that "I've played for many clubs, but I've never seen this kind of chaos like now in FK Novi Pazar." Like most of the playing squad, Dragoljub Bekvalac had not received payment in the previous four months and promptly resigned from the position of coach, and even considered suing the club via the district court for compensation. Days later, it was announced that famous Serbian coach Slavenko Kuzeljević, known for his success with Radnički Kragujevac, agreed to replace Bekvalac as coach. Subsequent to the announcement of the new coach, the former leader of Partizan's medical team, dr. Sead Malićević, was named the new president of the club. FK Novi Pazar finished 14th placed in the 2012–13 season which saw them remain in the first division.

During the 2013–14 season, Novi Pazar was in no danger of relegation. They won against OFK Belgrade at home and drew goalless against Partizan. They finished the season ranked 8th.

Novi Pazar improved their form in the 2014–15 Serbian Superliga season. They won 2–1 against Red Star at home, 3–1 against OFK Belgrade at home and drew 1–1 against Partizan at home and away. They finished the season placed 5th.

In season 2019/20 they finished mid table in the Serbian First League (Second Division )  but due to the FSS ( Football Association of Serbia) re-structuring the Serbian SuperLiga due to the COVID-19 Pandemic by adding four more teams to the top tier of the Serbian SuperLiga  and due to FK Novi Pazar having a modern UEFA standard stadium when most clubs in Serbia don't, they were awarded a place/took the place of FK Grafičar Beograd, a Belgrade club who basically had a pitch/field and no stadium to speak of. So after a three year absence FK Novi Pazar would again join the elite national competition

Stadium

Novi Pazar City Stadium (Serbian Cyrillic: Градски стадион у Новом Пазару), located in the eastern part of the city, is the home venue of FK Novi Pazar. The stadium was officially opened on 12 April 2012 after one-year reconstruction and it can hold 12,000 people at full capacity.

The stadium began undergoing complete reconstruction during the first half of 2011 in an ambitious project by the Football Association of Serbia and the city of Novi Pazar. The project includes the renovation of the eastern, west and northern stands. The project includes also the covering of the whole stadium, new floodlights, new locker and press room, new ambulance, parking area, ticket office. After reconstruction, the stadium fulfill the most up to date UEFA standards. The cost of the project was estimated to be over 230 million Serbian dinars (2 million euros).

Supporters

The three largest supporters groups of FK Novi Pazar are known as Torcida Sandžak, Ultra Azzurro and Ekstremi. Organized tifo support for FK Novi Pazar was first established in the late 1980s. Ultras of Fenerbahçe first recognized the fans of FK Novi Pazar in 2011, and a friendship now exists between the ultras of the clubs from Istanbul and Novi Pazar.

Ultras in Novi Pazar have Right-Wing views and have a recent history of both scandalous and disrespectful displays. In October 2012, Ekstremi held up a mocking display about the illegal organ harvesting in Kosovo as a provocation to Rad, a team from outside of Novi Pazar from where the supporters were mostly Christian Serbs. The incident garnered shocked reactions from media and government officials both in Serbia and in other countries. However, ultras in Novi Pazar are also known to act respectfully to visiting teams from outside of Novi Pazar.

In April 2013, during a home match against Partizan Belgrade, a supporter of FK Novi Pazar threw an activated homemade explosive device to the visiting supporters, who fell to the athletic field and did not explode. The explosive device was wrapped with tape and filled with nails. It was the same person, who caused on 26 November 2011, a false bomb alarm in the Novi Pazar City Stadium, which caused a criminal charge against him of causing panic. FK Novi Pazar club management sharply condemned the action.

Torcida Sandžak, on a different note, earned worldwide recognition when the group organized a protest in the form of a public march which was attended by thousands of people. The protest was held in a peaceful manner without negative incidents.

Kit manufacturers

League results

Players

Current squad

Players with multiple nationalities
   Periša Pešukić
   Bojica Nikčević
   Slobodan Stanojlović
   Nikola Bogdanovski
   Milos Filipović

Technical staff

Management

Notable former players
To appear in this section a player must have either:
 Played at least 80 games for the club.
 Set a club record or won an individual award while at the club.
 Played at least one international match for their national team at any time.

  Abdulah Gegić
  Rahim Beširović
  Almir Gegić
  Sead Hadžibulić
  Sead Halilagić
  Admir Kecap
   Kemal Kuč
  Đorđe Tutorić
  Bajro Župić
  Dario Damjanović
  Petar Jelić
  Denis Mujkić
  Amar Rahmanović
  Sead Ramović
  Admir Raščić
  Nemanja Supić
  Almedin Ziljkić
  Luis López
  Stefan Aškovski
  Darko Micevski
  Fahrudin Mustafić
  Vincent Kayizzi

For the list of current and former players with Wikipedia article, please see: :Category:FK Novi Pazar players.

Former coaches

 Rajko Rašević (1984-1985, 1989-1990)
  Hysni Maxhuni (1995–96)
  Bajro Župić
  Fikret Grbović
  Sead Halilagić (2006–07)
  Mladen Dodić (Dec 1, 2007 – 2008)
  Dušan Jevrić (2008–2009)
  Jovica Škoro (Sept 24, 2010 – Jan 4, 2011)
  Izet Ljajić (interim) (June 2, 2011 – June 30, 2011)
  Mihailo Ivanović (July 5, 2011 – Aug 29, 2011)
  Ljubomir Ristovski (Sept 23, 2011 – April 5, 2012)
  Dragoljub Bekvalac (April 5, 2012 – Dec 25, 2012)
  Slavenko Kuzeljević (Dec 25, 2012 – April 2, 2013)
  Nebojša Vučićević (April 11, 2013 – Aug 3, 2013)
  Milan Milanović (Aug 3, 2013 – Dec 16, 2013)
  Zoran Njeguš (Dec 23, 2013 – June 30, 2014)
  Milorad Kosanović (2014–215)
  Zoran Marić (January 16, 2016 – September 19, 2016)
  Slavko Matić (June 22, 2019 – September 10, 2019)
  Darko Tešović (September 11, 2019 – November 21, 2019) 
  Kenan Kolašinac (November 21, 2019 – November 10, 2020)
  Radoslav Batak (2020–2021)
  Davor Berber (2021)
  Milan Milanović (2021) 
  Kenan Kolašinac (2021)
  Dragan Radojičić (2021—2022)

References

External links

 Official
  
 Other
 FK Novi Pazar info

 
Football clubs in Serbia
Football clubs in Yugoslavia
Association football clubs established in 1928
1928 establishments in Serbia
Novi Pazar